The Night We Called It a Day may refer to:

"The Night We Called It a Day" (song), a popular song by Matt Dennis and Tom Adair
The Night We Called It a Day (film), a 2003 Australian movie about Frank Sinatra's trip to Australia
 The Night We Called It a Day (album), the first album by Deepspace5
The reissue of the Frank Sinatra album Where Are You?